Marielena is a Spanish-language telenovela written by Delia Fiallo. It premiered on Telemundo in 1992, and starred Lucía Méndez and Eduardo Yáñez. The telenovela was originally aired in a few dozen countries around the world.

Premise 
The story begins with a woman named Carmela Muñoz giving birth to a girl named Marielena in the middle of the Florida Straits while escaping Cuba in a boat. Years later, Marielena is a beautiful young woman living in Miami with her mother and siblings, Enrique, Jr. a.k.a. "Kike", Mercedes a.k.a. "Meche" and Yolanda a.k.a. "Yoly". Marielena is engaged to a young man named Javier. Yoly is married to a man named Alfredo Minelli a.k.a. Fredy, whose father Rufino works at a restaurant serenading guests, and Meche is the girlfriend of Javier's brother, Leon. Leon and Javier live with their parents Fucha and Teo close to Carmela's home. One day while walking back home after buying flowers, Marielena is hit by a red convertible. A handsome young man named Luis Felipe Sandoval steps out of the car and offers her money for the flowers but speeds away angrily when she asks only for an apology.

Production notes
The telenovela was filmed and produced in Miami, Florida and was also recorded during Hurricane Andrew. Sadly, Luis Oquendo died during filming after he suffered a heart attack.

Cast

References

External links 
 

1992 telenovelas
1992 American television series debuts
1992 American television series endings
Spanish-language American telenovelas
Telemundo telenovelas
Television series by Universal Television
Television shows set in Florida
Television shows filmed in Miami
American television series based on Venezuelan television series